Amalia Cahaya Pratiwi (born 14 October 2001) is an Indonesian badminton player affiliated with Mutiara Cardinal Bandung club. She was part of the national junior team that won the first Suhandinata Cup for Indonesia in 2019 BWF World Junior Championships. She also featured in the Indonesian women's winning team at the 2022 Asia Team Championships.

Career

2023 
In January, Amalia Cahaya Pratiwi with her partner Febriana Dwipuji Kusuma lost in the second round of Malaysia Open from first seed Chinese pair Chen Qingchen and Jia Yifan. They competed at the home tournament, Indonesia Masters, but had to lose in the first round from Chinese pair Li Wenmei and Liu Xuanxuan in a dramatic match. In the next tournament, they lost in the second round of the Thailand Masters from youngster Chinese pair Li Yijing and Luo Xumin who started from qualification.

Achievements

BWF World Junior Championships 
Girls' doubles

BWF World Tour (1 runner-up)
The BWF World Tour, which was announced on 19 March 2017 and implemented in 2018, is a series of elite badminton tournaments sanctioned by the Badminton World Federation (BWF). The BWF World Tour is divided into levels of World Tour Finals, Super 1000, Super 750, Super 500, Super 300 (part of the HSBC World Tour), and the BWF Tour Super 100.

Women's doubles

BWF Junior International (2 titles) 
Girls' doubles

  BWF Junior International Grand Prix tournament
  BWF Junior International Challenge tournament
  BWF Junior International Series tournament
  BWF Junior Future Series tournament

Performance timeline

National team 
 Junior level

 Senior level

Individual competitions

Junior level  
 Girls' doubles

Senior level 
 Women's doubles

References

External links 
 

2001 births
Living people
People from Sukoharjo Regency
Sportspeople from Central Java
Indonesian female badminton players
21st-century Indonesian women